Nelson "Viola" Gabolwelwe (born 3 September 1977) is a former Botswana footballer who played for Botswana Defence Force XI in the Mascom Premier League.

References

External links

1977 births
Living people
Botswana footballers
Botswana international footballers
Botswana Defence Force XI F.C. players
Association football defenders
Association football midfielders